"Your Wonderful, Sweet Sweet Love" is a song written by Smokey Robinson, recorded in October 1966 by Kim Weston. Her recording was not issued at the time as she left the label over a dispute over royalties in 1967. Weston's original version was first released in 2005.

The song was revisited and released as a single by Motown singing group The Supremes in 1972 as the third and final single from their popular album Floy Joy.  On the soul chart the song peaked at number twenty-two, while on the Hot 100 it went to number fifty-nine.

Personnel
Lead vocals by Jean Terrell
Background vocals by Mary Wilson and Cindy Birdsong
Additional vocals by The Andantes
Produced and written by Smokey Robinson

Charts

References

1972 singles
The Supremes songs
Songs written by Smokey Robinson
Motown singles
Song recordings produced by Smokey Robinson